The Monoyer chart was created by Ferdinand Monoyer and is used to test visual acuity. He inserted his name in the chart; reading upwards on both ends, but ignoring the first line, the name "Ferdinand Monoyer" can be seen.

See also
Snellen chart

References

Medical tests
Ophthalmology